The longsnout distichodus (Distichodus lusosso) is an African characin in the family Distichodontidae.

Description 
The body is a golden colour (most prominent in juveniles) with several vertical dark bands. Its back is well-arched, and it has reddish fins. The most defining feature of this species is its particularly long head, from which it earns its name.

References 

Distichodus
Fish described in 1891